Rapid Kuala Lumpur FC (often shortened to Rapid KL F.C.) is a Malaysian football club based in Kuala Lumpur. The club represents the Rapid KL, the transportations company in Malaysia football. The club entered the Malaysia FAM League in 2011 and got 5th place. The club also hold the biggest record of winning the match with 7-1 against Melodi Jaya Sports Club. Unfortunately, the club decided to pull out from 2012 season due to financial difficulties. The club is participating in KLFA Division 1 League since 2014.

Sponsorship

For season running from 2014, Rapid KL was club's first shirt sponsor. The manufacturer was Lotto.

Kit manufacturers and financial sponsor

Players

References

External links
 FAM Cup 2011 at MalaysianSuperLeague.com
 Football Association of Malaysia

Football clubs in Malaysia